David Corcoran is a former Australian rules football umpire who umpired in the Australian Football League.

Umpiring career

WAFL
Corcoran began his senior umpiring career with the West Australian Football League where he umpired his first league match in 1998. Corcoran umpired 115 WAFL league matches between 1998 and 2004 including four WAFL Grand Finals.

AFL
Corcoran joined the AFL list in 2001. He umpired 31 AFL matches up to May 2003 when his contract was terminated by the AFL.

References

Australian Football League umpires
West Australian Football League umpires
Living people
Year of birth missing (living people)